Arthur Burge (24 August 1917 – 20 February 1995) was an Australian water polo player. He competed in the men's tournament at the 1948 Summer Olympics.

References

1917 births
1995 deaths
Australian male water polo players
Olympic water polo players of Australia
Water polo players at the 1948 Summer Olympics
Water polo players from Sydney